Kiyoshi Hasegawa may refer to:
 Kiyoshi Hasegawa (admiral) (1883–1970), Japanese admiral and former Governor of Taiwan
 Kiyoshi Hasegawa (1891–1980), Japanese artist and engraver
 Kiyoshi Hasegawa (songwriter), Japanese songwriter and guitarist; see Tokiko Kato